Charles Webber may refer to:

Charles Edmund Webber (1838–1904), British soldier, engineer and author
Charles Wilkins Webber (1819–1856), American journalist and explorer
Charles Webber (priest) (1762–1848), English priest, Archdeacon of Chichester
Charles Webber, one of the candidates of the Australian federal election, 1949

See also
Charles Weber (disambiguation)